The 1991 Ithaca Bombers football team represented Ithaca College as an independent during the 1991 NCAA Division III football season. In their 22nd season under head coach Jim Butterfield, the Bombers compiled a 12–1 record. The team's only loss was to Division II . The team participated in the NCAA Division III playoffs, defeating  in the first round,  in the quarterfinals,  in the semifinals, and Dayton in the Stagg Bowl to win the Division III national championship.

The team played its home games at South Hill Field in Ithaca, New York.

Schedule

References

Ithaca
Ithaca Bombers football seasons
NCAA Division III Football Champions
Ithaca Bombers football